Bradley Sceney (born 24 January 1974) is an Australian former professional tennis player.

Sceney was a World Youth Cup (Junior Davis Cup) representative for Australia and won the junior doubles title at the 1992 Australian Open, with Grant Doyle. He has featured in men's singles qualifying draws for the Australian Open.

From 1995 to 1998, Sceney played collegiate tennis for Pepperdine University and broke the team record for career singles wins. He earned All-American honours for doubles in 1996, reaching the NCAA doubles championship quarter-finals that year. While at Pepperdine he made an ATP Tour doubles main draw appearance at Indian Wells.

Sceney, now a resident of the United States, is a former men's head coach at Loyola Marymount University.

References

External links
 
 

1974 births
Living people
Australian male tennis players
Loyola Marymount Lions coaches
Pepperdine Waves men's tennis players
Grand Slam (tennis) champions in boys' doubles
Australian Open (tennis) junior champions
College tennis coaches in the United States
Australian tennis coaches